Logan is the name of two unincorporated communities in Missouri:
Logan, Greene County, Missouri
Logan, Lawrence County, Missouri